Pyry Lampinen (born 7 March 2002) is a Finnish professional footballer who plays for KuPS as a midfielder.

References

2002 births
Living people
Finnish footballers
FC Lahti players
Reipas Lahti players
Kakkonen players
Veikkausliiga players
Association football midfielders
Kuopion Palloseura players